In traffic engineering, a merge is the point where two streams of traffic travelling in the same direction from multiple roads or in multiple lanes on the same road are required to merge into a single lane. 

A merge may be a permanent road feature, for example at the end of a dual carriageway, or a temporary feature, common during roadworks.

Methods

Slip road 
Generally speaking, at a slip road onto a controlled-access highway or otherwise, traffic on the highway has priority over traffic joining at the slip road, and therefore the slip road traffic should accelerate to the speed on the major road and merge into a gap in the stream of traffic in lane one. At some slip roads, traffic continues into a new lane (a "lane gain") and therefore does not need to merge.

Early merge 

The early merge method dictates that one stream of traffic will maintain priority over another at the merge, and therefore traffic in the other lane should merge at the first opportunity. To encourage drivers to merge early, authorities may employ a static or dynamic early merge strategy. Strictly speaking an early merge is different from a conventional merging method, in that the traffic is encouraged to merge well in advance of the merge point.

A static early merge strategy involves the placement of advance notices for a fixed distance in advance of the lane closure. This method may reduce the chance for rear-end collisions by warning drivers of the closure in advance of congestion.

A dynamic merge strategy involves advance notices for a variable distance from the lane closure. For example, in the US state of Indiana, a dynamic no-passing zone is created in advance of the merge, to ensure drivers can move into the open lane before reaching the end of a queue.

Late merge 

The late merge method dictates that both streams of traffic should continue to drive up to the point of closure, and merge at the marked taper. Both streams should create alternating gaps into which vehicles from the other stream can merge at the merge point. In heavy traffic flow, traffic should therefore queue in both lanes in advance of the merge.

The late merge method has not been found to increase throughput (throughput is the number of vehicles that pass through a point in a given period of time). However, it considerably reduces queue ("backup") length (because drivers use the ending lane until its end) and reduces speed differences between the two lanes, increasing safety. The late merge operates at a nearly 20 percent higher capacity than a conventional merge. In the case of Interstate 77 in North Carolina, where signs directed people to use the zipper merge, the maximum length of the backup was reduced from eight miles to two.

A possible dynamic merge method would use variable message signs to instruct drivers to use all available lanes and to merge in turn if queueing is detected. At other times, drivers would use a conventional merging method.

Governments hold campaigns to promote the late merge method because irritation and aggression are common among drivers who are not educated about the benefits of the technique, sometimes including straddling lanes to block late mergers. Often drivers who change lanes too early do not like to see other drivers continue until the end of the drop-away lane, even though this late merging is encouraged by the authorities.

In various jurisdictions 
In most countries, a driver can be penalized for not using the late merge method, but in some countries only where a traffic sign so indicates.

Canada 
British Columbia's sign manual provides designs for zipper merge signs.

United Kingdom 
Under the Highway Code, drivers should not use the right lane except when overtaking other vehicles, therefore they should move back to the left-hand lane as soon as it is safe to do so (Rule 137). The Code does however recommend merging in turn if it is safe and if vehicles are travelling at a very low speed (Rule 134).

United States 
Most states in the United States require merging traffic to yield to through traffic which already exists in the lane they wish to enter. This further complicates the common understanding of proper merging protocol, as even though zipper merging is widely encouraged, those doing so are still legally required to yield, and those who choose not to let them merge are not doing anything wrong from a legal standpoint. Traffic already in the lane being merged into has the right of way over the merging traffic from the lane that will disappear.

Minnesota and Missouri recommend that drivers zip merge. Pennsylvania's sign manual provides designs for zipper merge signs.

See also

 Filter in turn

References

Further reading

External links
http://www.dot.state.mn.us/zippermerge/

Road traffic management